Andrew Swim (born 20 February 1961) is a Canadian bobsledder. He competed in the four man event at the 1988 Winter Olympics.

References

External links
 

1961 births
Living people
Canadian male bobsledders
Olympic bobsledders of Canada
Bobsledders at the 1988 Winter Olympics
Sportspeople from Saint John, New Brunswick